McLennan Hills (also Te Aponga o Tainui) is one of the volcanoes in the Auckland volcanic field. It was a group of cratered scoria mounds up to 45 m high, before it was quarried away. A 1940 aerial photo (in Searle's book) shows a crater around 100 m wide, one around 50 m wide, and 2 or 3 smaller craters. McLennan Hills, alongside neighbouring Ōtāhuhu / Mount Richmond, were the sites of fortified pā in pre-European times, important due to their location between the Waitematā Harbour/Tāmaki River and the Manukau Harbour. Since the European settlement of Auckland, the scoria cone was quarried. The former quarry site was used for greenhouses before being redeveloped for housing.

References
City of Volcanoes: A geology of Auckland - Searle, Ernest J.; revised by Mayhill, R.D.; Longman Paul, 1981. First published 1964. .
Volcanoes of Auckland: A Field Guide. Hayward, B.W.; Auckland University Press, 2019, 335 pp. .

References

External links
 View south from Mt Wellington in 1920, showing McLennan Hills in distance.
 1940s aerial photo of Mclennan Hills.
Painting of McLennan Hills from the tuff ring crest of Mt Richmond in 1861.

Auckland volcanic field
Hills of the Auckland Region